Diaethria ceryx, the Ceryx eighty-eight, is a species of butterfly of the genus Diaethria. Diaethria ceryx was recorded for the first time in the coastal mountains in Manabí, Ecuador.

References

Biblidinae
Butterflies described in 1864
Nymphalidae of South America
Taxa named by William Chapman Hewitson